Raymond van het Groenewoud (born 14 February 1950) is a Belgian musician. He was born in Schaerbeek, of Dutch descent, and he sings primarily in Dutch. His biggest hits include "Vlaanderen Boven", "Meisjes", "Je Veux de l'Amour", "Zjoske Schone Meid" and "Liefde voor Muziek". He refers to himself as a musician but also a poet, philosopher and clown.

Career
His debut was as a guitar player with Johan Verminnen. In 1972 he started the group Louisette with Erik van Neygen. A number of solo albums followed, accompanied by his group De Centimeters. In 1977 he had his first hit record, the single "Meisjes" from the album Nooit Meer Drinken.

His lyrics are sometimes happy, sometimes sad, jovial or philosophical. In 1980 he had his first success in the Netherlands with a concert at the Pinkpop Festival and the hit "Je Veux de l'Amour".

He wrote the soundtrack for the film Brussels by Night by Marc Didden (1983).

In 1990 most of his songs were re-recorded for a compilation album, with a new single "Liefde voor Muziek", a parody of the gospel by James Brown in the movie The Blues Brothers. It reached number one in Belgium and the Netherlands.

Van het Groenewoud and his band performed a nearly 8-hour long concert at the closure of the Gentse Feesten in 2022, playing 111 songs.

Discography

Albums
 Je moest eens weten hoe gelukkig ik was (1973)
 Ik doe niet mee (1975)
 Nooit meer drinken (1977)
 Kamiel in België (1978)
 Ethisch reveil (1979)
 Leven en liefdes (1981)
 Brussels by Night (1984)
 Habba! (1984)
 Ontevreden (1986)
 Intiem (1988)
 Sensatie (1992)
 RvhGBox 10 (1993)
 De minister van ruimtelijke ordening (1994)
 Walhalla (1995)
 Ik ben God niet (1996)
 Liefde voor muziek (1996)
 Tot morgen (1998)
 Een jongen uit Schaarbeek (2001)
 Ballades (2004)
 Meneer Raymond (2005)
 Feest! Live! (2008)
 De laatste rit (2011)
 Live in de AB (2013)
 Allermooist Op Aard (2017)
 Speel (2020)

Compilation albums
 Meisjes (Het beste van Raymond van het Groenewoud) (1990)
 Het beste van Raymond van het Groenewoud (1974-1976) (1999)

Singles
 "Meisjes" (1977)
 "Je Veux de l'Amour" (1980)
 "Cha cha cha" (1981)
 "Liefde voor muziek" (1991)

DVDs
 Live in Antwerpen (2004)

References

External links

Introduction at the Belgian Pop & Rock archive
concertnews.be

Van het groenewoud, Raymond
Van het groenewoud, Raymond
20th-century Belgian male singers
20th-century Belgian singers
Belgian male guitarists
Living people
People from Schaerbeek
1950 births
Belgian Jews
Belgian comedy musicians
Belgian rock singers
Belgian rock guitarists
Dutch-language singers of Belgium
21st-century Belgian male singers
21st-century Belgian singers